The 2014 Rally Azores was the fifth round of the 2014 European Rally Championship season, held in Ponta Delgada between 15–17 May 2014.

It was won by Madeiran Bernardo Sousa and co-driver Hugo Magalhães while Kevin Abbring/Sebastian Marshall and Jean-Michel Raoux/Laurent Magat completed the podium.

Results

Junior ERC

References

2014 in Portuguese motorsport
2014 European Rally Championship season